Events from 1931 in Catalonia.

Incumbents

 President of the Generalitat of Catalonia – Francesc Macià (from 14 April)

Events
 12 April – Local elections in Spain gave the victory in Catalonia to the Republican Left of Catalonia (ERC).
 14 April – Francesc Macià proclaims the Catalan Republic in Barcelona. 
 17 April – The Catalan Republic becomes in the Generalitat of Catalonia presided by Macià himself, as an autonomous government within the new Spanish Republic.
 26 April – 29th IOC Session held in Barcelona, electing Berlin as the host city of 1936 Summer Olympic Games.
 23 June – El Be Negre, Catalan illustrated satirical weekly magazine, founded.
 2 August – Catalan voters approve the draft of Statute of Autonomy for Catalonia redacted in Núria (Ripollès, Girona).

Sport
 6 September – Volta a Catalunya begins.
 13 September – Volta a Catalunya ends, won by Salvador Cardona.

References